The East 34th Street Ferry Landing provides slips to ferries and excursion boats in the Port of New York and New Jersey. It is located on the East River in New York City east of the FDR Drive just north of East 34th Street in Midtown Manhattan. The facility, owned by the city, received Federal Highway Administration funding for improvements for docking facilities and upgrading the adjacent East River Greenway in 2008. A new terminal building was built and opened in 2016.

Service is provided by SeaStreak, which signs the landing as East 35th Street, and by NYC Ferry, which signs it as East 34th Street/Midtown. There is a M34 Select Bus Service bus stop adjacent to the ferry landing; the M15 local, M15 Select Bus Service and the M34A Select Bus Service have stops in the immediate vicinity at the intersection of First Avenue and East 34th Street. The East 34th Street Heliport is also on the waterfront south of the ferry landing.

History
A ferry crossing between Hunter's Point and 34th Street was established circa 1858 and later came under the control of Long Island Rail Road (LIRR). In 1905, the LIRR expanded the terminal between 33rd and 34th Streets which had five slips
 and was able to accommodate automobiles, and is now the site of the heliport. Service was discontinued in 1925 after numerous tunnel and bridge crossings had been built. Connecting mass transit service was provided by the 34th Street Ferry elevated station which was located east of First Avenue and operated from 1880 to 1930.

In the 1990s several proposals and various attempts were made to restore service to landings in the vicinity of 34th Street, among them an Upper East Side – Wall Street commuter service, a short-lived shuttle to La Guardia Airport and a fast ferry to Staten Island. Restoration of the traditional Hunters Point crossing was initiated and soon abandoned by NY Waterway.

By the mid-2000s  New York Water Taxi was regularly serving East 34th Street landings on the Hunters Point crossing and other routes. After a request for bids, the New York City Economic Development Corporation in 2011 awarded NY Waterway (which also operated a free transfer bus loop in Midtown East) a three-year contract and a $3 million annual subsidy to operate ferry service on  the East River including 34th Street.

In the aftermath of infrastructure damage and service disruptions to the New York City Subway system in Queens and Brooklyn caused by Hurricane Sandy on October 29, 2012, SeaStreak began running weekday ferry service between East 34th Street and Rockaway Park, Queens, with additional stops at Pier 11 and Brooklyn Army Terminal. Although the service proved popular, it was ultimately discontinued on October 31, 2014 when the city government declined to continue subsidizing it.

Service

SeaStreak

SeaStreak catamarans operate daily to the Raritan Bayshore in Monmouth County, New Jersey. After calling at Pier 11/Wall Street boats continue through The Narrows to terminals at Atlantic Highlands or Highlands. Seasonal excursions includes service to Sandy Hook, West Point, NY, Cold Spring, NY, and Martha's Vineyard.

New York Water Taxi
New York Water Taxi operates a shuttle service for NYU Langone Health between 34th Street and the Brooklyn Army Terminal. This service is primarily for hospital employees only and provides a connection between its academic medical center in Manhattan and NYU Langone Hospital – Brooklyn.

NYC Ferry
NYC Ferry's East River Ferry (formerly operated by NY Waterway) operates in both directions to Pier 11 at Wall Street, stopping at Hunters Point South in Long Island City, Queens and multiple ferry landings in northern Brooklyn, with year-round service. Additionally, the Astoria Ferry runs in both directions to Pier 11 or Astoria, Queens, with year-round service. The Lower East Side Ferry used to operate between Long Island City and Wall Street via eastern Manhattan year-round, but was then discontinued on May 18, 2020 due to low ridership. The Soundview Route runs in both directions to Wall Street or Soundview, Bronx, year-round.

See also
List of ferries across the East River
Battery Park City Ferry Terminal
West Midtown Ferry Terminal
Paulus Hook Ferry Terminal
Weehawken Port Imperial
Fulton Ferry, Brooklyn
St. George Ferry Terminal
Staten Island Ferry Whitehall Terminal

References

External links 
 Flickr: East 34th Street Ferry Landing

Ferry terminals in Manhattan
Port of New York and New Jersey
Transit hubs serving New Jersey
Kips Bay, Manhattan
34th Street (Manhattan)